V2 Records (or V2 Music; V2 being an abbreviation for Virgin 2) is a record label that was purchased by Universal Music Group in 2007 and sold to [PIAS] in 2013. In the Benelux, V2 operates separately from PIAS, as the label bought itself out from Universal in 2007.

History
The label was founded in 1996 by Richard Branson, five years after he sold Virgin Records to EMI. V2 management was led by the same individuals that built Branson's renowned balloon and the control position was held by a Canadian public corporation. The company was restructured after running into financial difficulties with Branson taking control and reinventing the brand.

The label was owned 95% by Morgan Stanley, the chief financier of the company, and 5% by Branson. Over the years V2 acquired Gee Street Records, Junior Boy's Own, Blue Dog Records, and Big Cat Records. The label also distributed many labels, such as Wichita, Fania, Luaka Bop, City Slang and Modular. Stereophonics were the first band to sign to the label.

V2 now operates in Australia, Belgium, Canada, France, Germany, Italy, Greece, Netherlands, Spain, Ireland, Sweden, United Kingdom, and United States. It was distributed in the US by BMG; however it left for WEA shortly after the formation of Sony BMG. Its headquarters were located at 14 East 4th Street in Manhattan, the former US home of Island Records, which was in the same building as the former Greenwich Village branch of Tower Records.

In April 2005, Cooperative Music was set up by the V2 Music Group as a transnational marketing and distribution operation which licenses independent labels, as opposed to individual artist companies which is the standard industry practice, for release in Europe, Australia and Japan. This in-house licensing division has an exclusive international marketing team with representation in the UK, Ireland, France, Germany, Italy, Spain, Holland, Belgium, Sweden, Norway, Denmark, Australia and Japan.

In May 2006, much of V2's catalogue, including multi-platinum artists Moby and The White Stripes, was added to eMusic, making the label one of the most high-profile featured on the online music site, which mostly sells DRM-free independent music at a cost considerably lower than many of its competitors.

In August 2007, V2 Music Group was sold for £7 million to Universal Music Group. Subsequently, in October 2007, UMG partnered the US operations of its independent distribution arm Fontana Distribution, known as Fontana International, with London-based Cooperative Music of V2 Music. The intent was to enhance expansion through international agreements, and so independent labels from Europe under Cooperative Music would gain access to the independent American marketplace through Fontana International's diverse connections in independent marketing, promotion and distribution support. Cooperative Music has had significant success with various acts such as Fleet Foxes, Phoenix and The Black Keys.

In 2013, [PIAS] has acquired Cooperative Music (including V2) from Universal Music Group.

In November 2022, Universal Music Group purchased 49% stake in [PIAS] (including [PIAS] Cooperative).

V2 Benelux 
V2 Benelux was founded by Richard Branson in 1997 as part of the V2 International group with affiliates in USA, UK, Scandinavia, Germany, France, Italy and Benelux. In February 2007 the directors of V2 Benelux, Chris Boog and Tom Willinck, rounded off a successful management buy out together with their distributor, Bertus Distribution.

Since September 2014 V2 Music offers full in-house label services in Benelux, France, and also Germany, Switzerland and Austria through Bertus Music Vertrieb GmbH.

V2 North America 
In 2006 Branson sold V2 North America to Sheridan Square Entertainment LLC (SSE) for $15 million. SSE then merged its label Artemis Records into V2 North America. The new label was effectively divested from the Virgin Group. Sheridan Square was later acquired by IndieBlu, which itself was acquired by Entertainment One.

On 12 January 2007, V2 North America announced that it was undergoing restructuring to focus on its back catalogue and digital distribution. As a result, their employees were let go and their roster of artists left as free agents.

Current & past artists

 12 Girls Band
 12 Rods
 Acoustic Ladyland
 Alex Gold
 Alkaline Trio
 A.M. Sixty
 Amusement Parks on Fire
 Antique
 At the Drive-In
 Ben Christophers
 Benedict Cork
 Billy Crawford
 Brendan Benson
 Best Fwends
 Better Than Ezra
 Birthmark
 The Black Crowes
 The Black Keys
 Blaudzun
 Bloc Party
 The Blood Brothers
 Blood Meridian
 Blood Red Shoes
 Ane Brun
 Carla Bruni
 CSS
 Burning Brides
 Isobel Campbell
 Cold War Kids
 Cornershop
 The Cribs
 The Crocketts
 The Crystal Method
 Ray Davies
 The Datsuns
 N'Dea Davenport
 dEUS
 Dogs Die In Hot Cars
 Dope
 Doug E. Fresh
 Duke Special
 Jesse James Dupree
 Elbow
 Every Move a Picture
 Mary Fahl
 Fixkes
 Grandaddy
 Gosling
 Gravediggaz
 The Greenhornes
 Paul Hardcastle
 Maximilian Hecker
 The High Llamas
 Hundred Reasons
 Michael Hutchence
 iamamiwhoami
 The Icarus Line
 InMe
 Intwine
 Jaimeson
 Jape
 The Jesus and Mary Chain
 John Coffey
 Tom Jones
 Jungle Brothers
 Kings of Infinite Space
 Ed Kowalczyk
 Mark Lanegan
 Langhorne Slim
 Lethal Bizzle
 Liberty X
 Lori Lieberman
 Little Man Tate
 Kirsty MacColl
 Madasun
 Madness
 Aimee Mann
 Mark Foggo's Skasters
 Charlie Mars
 Tom McRae
 The Meligrove Band
 Mercury Rev
 Moby
 The Mooney Suzuki
 Jean-Louis Murat
 Nada Surf
 New Kingdom
 One Minute Silence
 Declan O'Rourke
 Over It
 P.M. Dawn
 Phoenix
 Polar Bear
 Ian Pooley
 pre)Thing
 The Raconteurs
 The Rakes
 Raghav
 Ra Ra Riot
 Regular Fries
 rinôçérôse
 Josh Ritter
 Roman Candle
 Katy Rose
 The RZA
 Nitin Sawhney
 Scott 4
 Semifinalists
 Skin
 Paul Sherry
 Smoke Fairies
 Soulsavers
 Spirit Nation
 Stereophonics
 Sugarcult
 Alice Temple
 Those Bastard Souls
 Tin Star
 Toots & the Maytals
 Tragedy Khadafi
 Underworld
 The White Stripes
 yourcodenameis:milo
 Vitamin C

See also
 List of record labels

References

External links
 
 Cooperative Music

 
British record labels
Record labels established in 1996
Rock record labels
Hip hop record labels
Electronic dance music record labels
IFPI members
2007 mergers and acquisitions